Charles C. Pyle (March 26, 1882 – February 3, 1939), often called Cash and Carry Pyle, was a Champaign–Urbana, Illinois theater owner and sports agent who represented American football star Red Grange and French tennis player Suzanne Lenglen. After his signing of Grange in 1925 and Grange's becoming a star for the Chicago Bears of the National Football League (NFL), Pyle founded the first New York Yankees football team.  When Pyle's application for the Yankees joining the NFL was rejected, he announced the formation of the first American Football League in 1926. The league lasted one season before folding.

In 1926, Pyle signed Lenglen and several of the best tennis players in the world to start the first professional tennis tour, which traveled throughout the U.S. and Canada. Two years later, he inaugurated the first Trans-American Footrace, known as the Bunion Derby, an ambitious, 3455-mile-long foot race from Los Angeles, California, to Chicago, Illinois, to New York. While the 1928 race was not a financial success, Pyle organized a 1929 "return" along essentially the same route, but from New York to Los Angeles.

After managing the "Ripley's Believe It or Not" exhibit in the Chicago World's Fair, Pyle married comedian Elvia Allman Tourtellotte in 1937. He became president of the Radio Transcription Company, a position that he held until his death of a heart attack in Los Angeles, February 3, 1939.

A play based on his life, C.C. Pyle and the Bunion Derby, was written by Tony Award winner Michael Cristofer and directed by Paul Newman.

References

1882 births
1939 deaths
American sports agents
New York Yankees (NFL)
National Football League owners
History of tennis
Professional tennis promoters